Finn Gjertsen (born 30 March 1959) is a Norwegian artistic gymnast. He was born in Sandefjord. He competed at the 1984 Summer Olympics in Los Angeles. He won a total of five gold medals at Norwegian championships.

References

External links

1959 births
Living people
People from Sandefjord
Norwegian male artistic gymnasts
Olympic gymnasts of Norway
Gymnasts at the 1984 Summer Olympics
Sportspeople from Vestfold og Telemark
20th-century Norwegian people